Negativland is Negativland's first album, released in 1980.  Each copy of the  album has a different cover.  The initial pressing was 500 copies.  Unlike all other Negativland albums, the album has no titles for the songs, just numbers. It is the rarest Negativland album, next to the misprinted Dispepsi albums and the U2 E.P.

Critical reception
AllMusic wrote that "it's a very subtle record on balance, though, only here and there being as flat-out jarring and, dare it be said, epic as later albums, but with a fine ear to offsetting what might be pure ambient sound with a sense of both dynamics and construction." Trouser Press called the album "evocative yet very elusive."

Track listing 
All songs by Mark Hosler/Richard Lyons/David Wills.
 1 (1:01)
 2 (1:25)
 3 (2:16)
 4 (1:22)
 5 (5:19)
 6 (1:18)
 7 (0:57)
 8 (1:01)
 9 (2:02)
 10 (1:36)
 11 (0:47)
 12 (0:33)
 13 (1:55)
 14 (0:38)
 15 (2:12)
 16 (3:17)
 17 (1:12)
 18 (1:34)
 19 (5:04)
 20 (1:09)

Personnel
Mark Hosler - tapes, electronics, rhythms, Booper, clarinet, organ, viola, loops, guitar, etc.
Richard Lyons - tapes, electronics, rhythms, Booper, clarinet, organ, viola, loops, guitar, etc.
David Wills - synthesizer, voice, tape
Peter Dayton - guitars, viola
W. Kennedy M. (Bill McFarland) - guitar
Joan Alderdice - bellbeating

References

Negativland albums
1980 debut albums